Ligumia is a genus of freshwater mussels, aquatic bivalve mollusks in the family Unionidae.

Species
Species within the genus Liguma include: 
 Ligumia recta (Lamarck, 1819)
Species brought into synonymy
 Ligumia nasuta: synonym of Sagittunio nasutus (Say, 1817)
 Ligumia subrostrata  (Say, 1831): synonym of Sagittunio subrostratus (Say, 1831)

References

 Williams, J. D.; Bogan, A. E.; Garner, J. T. (2008). Freshwater mussels of Alabama and the Mobile Basin in Georgia, Mississippi and Tennessee. University of Alabama Press, Tuscaloosa. 908 pp
 InvertEBase. (2015). Authority files of U.S. and Canadian land and freshwater mollusks developed for the InvertEBase project (invertebase.org).

External links
 Swainson, W. (1840). A treatise on malacology or shells and shell-fish. London, Longman. viii + 419 pp

 
Bivalve genera
Taxonomy articles created by Polbot